The Sumbawa Pony (Indonesian: kuda-Sumbawa) is a pony breed, named after the island on which they are bred, Sumbawa Island in Indonesia. This breed is very similar to the Sumba or Sandalwood Pony, a breed also developed in these islands, which came from crossing the native ponies on horses of Arabian breeding. The Sumbawa Pony descends from Mongolian Horses and ancient Chinese stock

Characteristics
"Sumbawa", or in Indonesian "", is the international name for this breed, according to the Food and Agriculture Organization of the United Nations.

Sumbawa ponies are quick, agile, athletic, and fast, with great endurance and a willing temperament. They usually have primitive coloring, with many individual horses being dun with a dorsal stripe and black points, although they may be any color. The Sumba and Sumbawa ponies have a heavy head, short, muscular neck, and low withers. The back is usually long, although it is still strong, and the legs are fine but tough with good hooves.

History
Very little is known about history of the horse in Southeast Asia, because few studies have been published, and many of those have a European bias. The first serious studies came with Peter Boomgaard in 2004.  Horse trading in Sumbawa flourished throughout History, with tough competition between breeders from Sumba, which export the Sandalwood Pony, and those of Sumbawa. There is also competition from breeders from Timor and Savu.

It is likely that Sumbawa horse was introduced to the island by the Javanese people of Majapahit Empire,  who conquered the island in the 14th century. 
The sultans of Bima and West Sumbawa are deemed to possess numerous horses. This breed and the Sumba are supposed to be close from the Mongolian Horse. Although Arabic origin is often cited in ancient documents (including the Dutch ones), there is no evidence of this in Indonesian horses and Sumbawa ponies.

Uses
Sumbawa ponies are today used for packing, riding, and light draft work. They are  strong, and many are ridden by men in games of lance throwing despite never reaching . Young boys also ride the ponies bareback in traditional dance competitions, manuveuring them in patterns as instructed. The legs of the ponies are decorated with bells that chime in rhythm to the drumming.

See also
List of horse breeds
Gayo Pony
Sandalwood Pony

References

Bibliography 

 
 
 , « Sumba »

Horse breeds
Horse breeds originating in Indonesia